The year 1963 in science and technology involved some significant events, listed below.

Astronomy, astrophysics and space exploration
 January 4 – Soviet Luna reaches Earth orbit but fails to reach the Moon.
 May 15 – Mercury program: NASA launches the last mission of the program Mercury 9. (On June 12 NASA Administrator James E. Webb tells Congress the program is complete.)
 July 26 – Roy Kerr submits for publication his discovery of the Kerr metric, an exact solution to the Einstein field equation of general relativity, predicting a rotating black hole.
 October 18 – Aboard the French Véronique AGI 47 sounding rocket, a bicolor cat designated C 341, later known as Félicette, becomes the first cat in space.
 November 1 – The Arecibo Observatory, with the world's largest single-dish radio telescope, officially opens in Arecibo, Puerto Rico.
 First definite identification of a radio source, 3C 48, with an optical object, later identified as a quasar, is published by Allan Sandage and Thomas A. Matthews; also Maarten Schmidt publishes significant observations on 3C 273.

Biology
 Geneticist J. B. S. Haldane coins the word "clone".
 Molecular biologist Emile Zuckerkandl and physical chemist Linus Pauling introduce the term paleogenetics.
 Konrad Lorenz publishes On Aggression (Das sogenannte Böse: Zur Naturgeschichte der Aggression).
 Niko Tinbergen poses his four questions to be asked of any animal behavior.
 Sydney Brenner proposes the use of Caenorhabditis elegans as a model organism for the investigation primarily of neural development in animals.

Cartography
 Robinson projection devised by Arthur H. Robinson.

Computing
 Ivan Sutherland writes the revolutionary Sketchpad program and runs it on the Lincoln TX-2 computer at Massachusetts Institute of Technology.

Earth sciences
 September 7 – British geophysicists Fred Vine and Drummond Matthews publish proof of seafloor spreading on the Atlantic Ocean floor.
 November 14 – The Icelandic volcanic island of Surtsey appears above sea level.

History of science and technology
 April 1 – Industrial Monuments Survey for the Ministry of Public Building and Works (Great Britain) commenced by Rex Wailes.
 Kenneth Hudson's Industrial Archaeology: an introduction published in London.
 Derek J. de Solla Price's Little Science, Big Science published in New York.

Mathematics
 Paul Cohen uses forcing to prove that the continuum hypothesis and the axiom of choice  are independent from Zermelo–Fraenkel set theory.
 Walter Feit and John G. Thompson state the Feit–Thompson theorem.
 Edward Lorenz publishes his discovery of the 'butterfly effect', significant in the development of chaos theory.
 Atiyah–Singer index theorem announced by Michael Atiyah and Isadore Singer.

Medicine
 June – Guy Alexandre performs the first kidney transplantation from a heart-beating, brain-dead donor, at Saint Pierre Hospital, Leuven, Belgium.
 Thomas Starzl performs the first liver transplantation, at the University of Colorado Health Sciences Center.
 James D. Hardy performs the first lung transplantation.
 American endocrinologist Grant Liddle identifies Liddle's syndrome.
 French pediatrician Jérôme Lejeune first describes cri du chat syndrome.
 Pentasomy X is first diagnosed.

Paleontology
 The type species of the early dinosaur Herrerasaurus, Herrerasaurus ischigualastensis from the north of Argentina, is described by Osvaldo Reig.

Physics
 David H. Frisch and J. H. Smith prove radioactive decay of mesons is slowed by their motion. (See Einstein's special relativity and general relativity.)

Psychology
 Stanley Milgram publishes the results of his shock experiment on obedience to authority figures.
 The term "contrafreeloading" was coined.

Technology
 Lava lamp invented by Edward Craven Walker.
 Mellotron Mark I electro-mechanical, polyphonic tape replay keyboard, developed and built in Aston, Birmingham, England, is marketed.
 Don Buchla begins to design an electronic music synthesizer in Berkeley, California.

Events
 November 23 – First episode of science fiction television series Doctor Who broadcast by the BBC in the United Kingdom.

Awards
 Nobel Prizes
 Physics – Eugene Paul Wigner, Maria Goeppert-Mayer, J. Hans D. Jensen
 Chemistry – Karl Ziegler, Giulio Natta
 Medicine – Sir John Carew Eccles, Alan Lloyd Hodgkin, Andrew Fielding Huxley

Births
 January 4 – May-Britt Moser, Norwegian neuroscientist, winner of the Nobel Prize in Physiology or Medicine.
 February 9 – Brian Greene, American theoretical physicist.
 February 10 – Vivian Wing-Wah Yam, Hong Kong chemist working on OLEDs
 March – Jin Li, Chinese geneticist.
 August 14  – Saiful Islam, Pakistani-born materials chemist.
 August 30 – Magdalena Zernicka-Goetz, Polish-born developmental biologist.
 W. Tecumseh Fitch, American-born evolutionary biologist.
 Daniel Jackson, English-born American computer scientist.

Deaths
 January 28 – Jean Piccard (born 1884), Swiss-born American chemist and explorer.
 February 5 – Barnum Brown (born 1873), American paleontologist.
 April 6 – Otto Struve (born 1897), Russian astronomer.
 May 11 – Herbert Spencer Gasser (born 1888), American physiologist, winner of the Nobel Prize in Physiology or Medicine.
 May 19 – Walter Russell (born 1871), American polymath.
 June 16 – Eleanor Williams (born 1884), Australian bacteriologist and serologist.
 August 30 – Marietta Pallis (born 1882), British ecologist.
 October 13 – Alan A. Griffith (born 1893), English stress engineer.
 October 2 – Olga Lepeshinskaya (born 1871), Soviet Lysenkoist biologist.
 October 25 – Karl von Terzaghi (born 1883), Austrian "father of soil mechanics".
 November 13 – Margaret Murray (born 1863), Indian-English anthropologist and author.

References

 
20th century in science
1960s in science